

Subspecies
 Mesechthistatus furciferus furciferus (Bates, 1884)
 Mesechthistatus furciferus meridionalis (Hayashi, 1951)

References

Phrissomini
Beetles described in 1884